The Commodore Barry Bridge (also known as the Commodore John Barry Bridge or John Barry Bridge) is a cantilever bridge that spans the Delaware River from Chester, Pennsylvania to Bridgeport, in Logan Township, New Jersey. It is named after the American Revolutionary War hero and Philadelphia resident John Barry.

Along with the Betsy Ross Bridge, the Benjamin Franklin Bridge and the Walt Whitman Bridge, the Commodore Barry Bridge is one of the four toll bridges connecting the metropolitan Philadelphia region with southern New Jersey owned by the Delaware River Port Authority (DRPA). Originally designed to connect with a now-cancelled freeway, the limited-access bridge has recently been retrofitted to better serve the local area. Between 2007 and 2011, both the DRPA and the PennDOT, in conjunction with the Chester Redevelopment Authority, built a pair of entrance-exit ramps that allowed motorists, primarily heavy truck traffic, to access the Chester Waterfront, via Pennsylvania Route 291 and Flower Street (via West 9th Street (U.S. Route 13)) from I-95. Other improvements, such as deck joint replacement, concrete patching (on the approaches), and other safety and engineering improvements are either ongoing or have been completed.

The bridge replaced the Chester–Bridgeport Ferry, a ferry service that from July 1, 1930 to February 1, 1974, was the sole means of crossing the Delaware River from Delaware County, Pennsylvania to Gloucester County, New Jersey. The Chester side of the ferry service experienced the Wade Dump fire and SuperFund cleanup, and has since become the city-owned Barry Bridge Park with the adjacent Subaru Park (home of the Major League Soccer's Philadelphia Union franchise) being opened in 2010.

History

Construction of the bridge began on April 14, 1969, and it opened to traffic on February 1, 1974. The road has a total of five lanes, divided by a zipper barrier, which was added to the bridge in 2002, in which a machine can configure the number of lanes in each direction, depending upon traffic volume or construction. The bridge is designated as part of U.S. Route 322 and has direct connections with PA Route 291 (W. 2nd Street), U.S. Route 13 (W. 9th Street) and Interstate 95 in Chester and U.S. Route 130 in Bridgeport, with a connection to Interstate 295 and the New Jersey Turnpike within a  radius of the bridge.

Originally created to be a connection to one of the then-proposed freeways in New Jersey, the Commodore Barry Bridge was to connect Interstate 95 near Chester to, at one point, the Atlantic City Expressway near Hammonton, but those plans were eventually scrapped when it was realized that many people in the college town of Glassboro would be affected. There are new talks of possibly upgrading US 322 to a freeway from US 130 to Interstate 295's current Exit 11, or even as far as the New Jersey Turnpike's Exit 2. There is no mention if this new freeway would be included in the Interstate Highway System, though it hasn't been ruled out yet, either.

In 1978, an intense fire broke out at Wade Dump, a rubber recycling facility and illegal industrial chemical dumping site almost directly under the bridge. The heat, rising flames and noxious fumes shut down the bridge temporarily. The burning chemicals injured 43 firemen and caused long-term health problems for the first responders to the fire.  In 1981, the location was declared a Superfund cleanup site and remediation occurred throughout the 1980s. In 1989, the site was deemed safe and removed from the Superfund national priorities list. In 2004 the site was converted to a parking lot for the nearby Barry Bridge Park.

Tolls

A $5.00 one-way toll is charged entering Pennsylvania for passenger vehicles (less than  gross vehicle weight). A $12 credit will be given on a per tag basis for any DRPA-issued E-ZPass tag that crosses one of the four DRPA bridges 18 times in a calendar month. Trucks, Commercial vehicles, mobile homes and recreation vehicles (weighing at least . gross vehicle weight), pay $7.50 cash per axle. Seniors aged 65 and over with an NJ E-ZPass can use a discount program to pay $2.50 per trip.

See also
 
 
 
 
 List of crossings of the Delaware River

References

External links

 Delaware River Port Authority - Commodore Barry Bridge
Commodore Barry Bridge: Historic Overview
 

Delaware River Port Authority
Toll bridges in New Jersey
Toll bridges in Pennsylvania
Bridges completed in 1974
Bridges over the Delaware River
U.S. Route 322
Road bridges in New Jersey
Road bridges in Pennsylvania
Chester, Pennsylvania
Logan Township, New Jersey
1974 establishments in Pennsylvania
Bridges of the United States Numbered Highway System
Steel bridges in the United States
Cantilever bridges in the United States
Bridges in Delaware County, Pennsylvania
Transportation buildings and structures in Gloucester County, New Jersey
Interstate vehicle bridges in the United States